Solo is a live album by Cecil Taylor recorded at Iino Hall in Chiyoda, Tokyo on May 29, 1973, and released on the Japanese Trio label.

Track listing
All compositions by Cecil Taylor.
 "Choral of Voice (Elesion)" - 7:15
 "Lono" - 9:19
 "Asapk in Ame" - 7:03
 "Indent" - 7:15
Recorded in Tokyo on May 29, 1973

Personnel
Cecil Taylor – piano

References

1973 live albums
Cecil Taylor live albums
Solo piano jazz albums